Tegostoma baphialis is a species of moth in the family Crambidae. It is found in Greece, Russia, Turkmenistan and Afghanistan.

The wingspan is 16–17 mm.

References

Moths described in 1871
Odontiini
Moths of Europe
Moths of Asia
Taxa named by Otto Staudinger